In 2009, Hull Kingston Rovers, competing in their 128th season, played in their third Super League season, as well as the 2009 Challenge Cup.

Transfers
Transfers for 2009 (In)

Transfers for 2009 (Out)

Full squad

Fixtures and results

Notes

Note A: Warrington won 24–25 via the golden point rule.

External links
 Hull KR's official website

Hull Kingston Rovers seasons
Hull Kingston Rovers season